Remziye Sıvacı (born 1 January 1965) is a Turkish politician from the Justice and Development Party (AKP), who has served as a Member of Parliament for Afyonkarahisar in 2015.

Early life and career
Remziye Sıvacı was born on 20 April 1970 in Malatya, completing her primary and high school education in Eskişehir in 1973. She graduated from Selçuk University Faculty of medicine in 1991. In 1999, she became a deputy Docent at Afyon Kocatepe University Faculty of Medicine in Afyonkarahisar. She became a Docent at this University in 2006.

In 2008, she worked at the cardiovascular anesthesia department of Charite University Faculty of Medicine in Berlin, Germany. She worked in the same position in Otto-van-Guericke University in Magdeburg in 2010. She became an expert in algology in 2011, working at the Robotic cardiovascular anaesthesia department of the Cleveland Clinic in the United States in 2010. She became a Professor in the Afyon Kocatepe University Faculty of Medicine in 2012. In 2014, she worked in the Hackensack University Pain and Palliative Medicine Department.

Political career
Having been a member of the Justice and Development Party (AKP) since 2012, Sıvacı was elected as an AKP Member of Parliament for Afyonkarahisar in the June 2015 general election. However she was not renominated for the snap November 2015 election.

See also
25th Parliament of Turkey

References

External links
 MP profile on the Grand National Assembly website
 Collection of all relevant news items at Haberler.com

Justice and Development Party (Turkey) politicians
Deputies of Afyonkarahisar
Members of the 25th Parliament of Turkey
Living people
People from Malatya
1965 births